The Dalia power station is a power station located approximately 2 km southeast of Kfar Menahem, Israel, nearby Tel Tzafit.

Owned by Dalia Energies, Ltd., an Israeli holding company, it is the largest independent power station in the country. It can generate up to a total of 870 megawatts (MW) of electricity which is sold to the IEC and to large industrial/institutional customers through the IEC's distribution grid.

The station is located adjacent to the IEC's Tzafit power complex, a major switching junction in the national electrical grid that also houses several existing IEC-owned and operated turbines with a total generation capacity of 615MW.

The Dalia power station consists of two Alstom KA26 single-shaft combined cycle power plant packages, each containing a GT26 gas turbine, STF15C steam turbine, generator and a heat recovery steam generator (HRSG). Alstom is also tasked with designing and constructing the station, then operating and maintaining it over a 20-year period. Additionally, Dalia Energies has requested permission from the electric authority to conduct a feasibility study for adding additional generation units to the station.

The station's primary fuel is natural gas, with light fuel oil acting as a backup fuel. The plant's owners have committed to purchasing at least 1.4 billion cubic meters (BCM) of natural gas annually from the offshore Tamar gas field to power the station.

References

Natural gas-fired power stations in Israel